Gloria del Tránsito Alvarado Jorquera (born 23 March 1963) is a Chilean activist who was elected as a member of the Chilean Constitutional Convention.

References

External links
 
 BCN Profile

Living people
1963 births
21st-century Chilean politicians
21st-century Chilean women politicians
Members of the Chilean Constitutional Convention